The Korean Popular Culture and Arts Awards is an annual South Korean government-run awards ceremony hosted by the Ministry of Culture, Sports and Tourism's Korea Creative Content Agency. The ceremony, which was first held in 2010, "honor[s] those who have made a contribution to contemporary pop culture and the arts, including actors, singers, comedians and models."

Categories 
There are four categories of awards: 

 Order of Cultural Merit (문화훈장)
 Presidential Commendation (대통령표창)
 Prime Minister's Commendation (국무총리표창)
 Minister of Culture, Sports and Tourism Commendation (문화체육관광부장관표창)

The Order of Cultural Merit is considered to be a higher honor than the commendations.

Award recipients 
† - posthumously awarded

Most awarded

The following award recipients have received multiple honors:
 BTS (2)
 EXO (2)
 Kim Soo-hyun (2)
 Shinee (2)
 Yoo Jae-suk (2)

See also

 List of Asian television awards

References

External links 

 Official website (in Korean)

Annual events in South Korea
Awards established in 2010
South Korean music awards
South Korean film awards
South Korean television awards
Recipients of the Order of Cultural Merit (Korea)